Bush-Usher House	Upload image	June 29, 1982
(#82002467)	E. Main St.
32°02′58″N 84°47′29″W	Lumpkin	

The Bush-Usher House, or Usher House, on E. Main St. in Lumpkin, Georgia, was built before 1919.  It was listed on the National Register of Historic Places in 1982.

It is a one-story clapboarded bungalow with a square central hall plan, built upon a brick pier foundation.  It has a balloon frame and a hipped roof;  its eaves have exposed purlins;  it has three interior chimneys.

It was home of J. Fred Usher, a local carpenter.

It was expanded by a shed addition to the rear around the 1940s, and in 1980 there was a c.1930 tin garage at the back.

It was listed as part of a study of historic resources in Lumpkin which led to National Register nomination of 15 historic districts and individual buildings.

References

Bungalow architecture in Georgia (U.S. state)
National Register of Historic Places in Stewart County, Georgia
Buildings and structures completed in 1919